Autreville may refer to the following places in France:

 Autreville, Aisne, a commune in the department of Aisne
 Autreville, Vosges, a commune in the department of Vosges
 Autréville-Saint-Lambert, a commune in the department of Meuse
 Autreville-sur-la-Renne, a commune in the department of Haute-Marne
 Autreville-sur-Moselle, a commune in the department of Meurthe-et-Moselle